{{DISPLAYTITLE:C14H12O3}}
The molecular formula C14H12O3 (molar mass: 228.25 g/mol, exact mass: 228.078644 u) may refer to:

 Benzilic acid
 Benzyl salicylate
 Desmethoxyyangonin, a kavalactone
 Oxybenzone
 Resveratrol
 Trioxsalen

Molecular formulas